Redgate is a small locality located in the South West region of Western Australia in the Shire of Augusta-Margaret River.

References 

Towns in Western Australia
South West (Western Australia)